Guns of War is a 1974 Yugoslav film directed by Žika Mitrović. It is one of the most notable examples of partisan film, a Yugoslav subgenre of World War II films which was popular between the 1960s and 1980s. The prevailing themes of anti-fascist struggle set in wartime Yugoslavia are also present here, as the film tells the story of the rise and fall of the Republic of Užice, a short-lived territory liberated by Yugoslav partisans which existed for several months in 1941.

The film shows several love stories unfolding on the backdrop of historical events and includes appearances by Miodrag Lazarević as Chetnik leader Draža Mihailović and Marko Todorović as Josip Broz Tito.

The film won two Golden Arena awards at the 1974 Pula Film Festival, the Yugoslav national film awards, including Best Film and Best Supporting Actress (Ružica Sokić). It was also entered into the 9th Moscow International Film Festival where it won a Diploma.

Main cast
 Boris Buzančić – Bora
 Božidarka Frajt – Nada
 Branko Milićević – Miša
 Milutin Mićović – Radovan
 Aljoša Vučković – Luka
 Rade Šerbedžija – Chetnik mayor Kosta Barac
 Marko Nikolić – Klaker
 Ivan Jagodić - Ilija
 Ružica Sokić – Mira
 Neda Arnerić – Jelena
 Dušan Vojnović – Sava
 Mija Aleksić – Toza
 Petre Prličko – baker Pero
 Vasa Pantelić – Dragi Simić
 Bogoljub Petrović –Chetnik captain Đorđević
 Dragan Ocokoljić – Partisan doctor
 Miodrag Lazarević – Colonel Dragoljub Mihailović
 Božo Jajčanin – Captain Duane Hudson
 Marko Todorović – Josip Broz Tito

References

External links

1974 films
Yugoslav drama films
Serbian drama films
Serbo-Croatian-language films
Partisan films
Films set in Serbia
Films set in Yugoslavia
Films about anti-fascism
Films about Josip Broz Tito
Cultural depictions of Serbian men
Cultural depictions of Draža Mihailović
War films set in Partisan Yugoslavia